Harrogate District Hospital is an acute general hospital in Harrogate, North Yorkshire, England. It is managed by Harrogate and District NHS Foundation Trust.

History

The hospital has its origins in the Harrogate General Hospital on Knaresborough Road which was completed in 1932. It joined the National Health Service in 1948.

In the 1970s work began to build a modern replacement facility on Lancaster Park Road. The first phase, which consisted of an accident and emergency department, some laboratories and a few wards, was opened by Princess Margaret in January 1975. The second phase - which also accommodated services transferring from the Royal Baths Hospital and the Scotton Hospital as well as several smaller hospitals in the area - was fully completed in 1998. The Queen and the Duke of Edinburgh visited the site later that year to celebrate the completion of the hospital and to conduct the official opening of the Strayside wing.

The Sir Robert Ogden Macmillan Cancer Centre was completed in 2014 and Prince Charles and the Duchess of Cornwall made an official visit to it in 2016.

Harrogate Hospital Radio
The Hospital has a hospital radio station which has won several awards from the Hospital Broadcasting Association.

References

Hospitals in North Yorkshire
Buildings and structures in Harrogate
NHS hospitals in England